Cyril Eric Carr   (1926 – 1 November 1981) was a British Liberal Party politician.

Living in Liverpool, Carr became the senior partner in a legal firm.  He was active in the Liberal Party, and was elected to Liverpool City Council in 1962.  He focused on building the party's strength in the city, and served as Chairman of the Liberal Party nationally from 1972 for a year.  In 1974, the Liberals became the largest party in Liverpool, and Carr served for a year as leader of the council.

Also in 1974, Carr involved himself in successful negotiations to release the Pentecostal minister David Hathaway from prison in Czechoslovakia, where he had been charged with distributing religious literature.  In 1975, he proposed the addition of "Social Democrat" to the Liberal Party's name, as he believed that this would appeal to both Labour Party and some Conservative Party voters.  This suggestion was not taken up until the 1988, when the Liberals merged with the Social Democratic Party.

References

1926 births
1981 deaths
Chairs of the Liberal Party (UK)
Liberal Party (UK) councillors
Politicians from Liverpool
Councillors in Liverpool
Commanders of the Order of the British Empire
English Jews
Jewish British politicians